The Best Horror of the Year: Volume One is a horror fiction anthology edited by Ellen Datlow that was published on January 1, 2009. It is the first in The Best Horror of the Year series.

Contents
The book includes 21 stories, all first published in 2008. The book also includes a summation by Datlow, and a list of honorable mentions for the year. The stories are as follows:

E. Michael Lewis: "Cargo"
Richard Bowes: "If Angels Fight"
Steve Duffy: "The Clay Party"
William Browning Spencer: "Penguins of the Apocalypse"
Glen Hirshberg: "Esmeralda"
Trent Hergenrader: "The Hodag"
Nicholas Royle: "Very Low-Flying Aircraft"
Margaret Ronald: "When the Gentlemen Go By"
Laird Barron: "The Lagerstätte"
Euan Harvey: "Harry and the Monkey"
Miranda Siemienowicz: "Dress Circle"
Daniel Kaysen: "The Rising River"
JoSelle Vanderhooft: "Sweeney Among the Straight Razors"
R. B. Russell: "Loup-garou"
Graham Edwards: "Girl in Pieces"
Joe R. Lansdale: "It Washed Up"
Mike Allen: "The Thirteenth Hell"
Margo Lanagan: "The Goosle"
Daniel LeMoal: "Beach Head"
Adam Golaski: "The Man from the Peak"
Simon Bestwick: "The Narrows"

External links
 
Book review by Orrin Grey, Innsmouth Magazine

2009 anthologies
Horror anthologies
Night Shade Books books